William Harvey House is a historic home located in Pennsbury Township, Chester County, Pennsylvania. The original house was built , and is a - to -story, stone banked dwelling. It is the earliest of the five Harvey family homes in Pennsbury Township.

William Harvey, a maker of malt, immigrated from Lye, Worcestershire, England prior to 1715.  He purchased 300 acres of land in 1715. He died in 1754, leaving the house to his son, William Harvey.  That son owned the house when it was in the line of fire during the Battle of Brandywine in 1777.  A local legend holds that he refused to leave his home until a 12-pound cannonball came through the kitchen wall, however, a later register of damages from the British occupation shows a loss of farm animals, hay, and oats, but no claim for household goods.

Descriptions of the property from the will of the grandson of the original William Harvey show that no structural changes were made to the house between 1821 and a remodel sometime after 1926.  The house was added to the National Register of Historic Places in 1971.

References

External links
 
 William Harvey House, Brinton Bridge Road (Pennsbury Township), Chadds Ford, Delaware County, PA: 4 photos, 7 data pages, and 1 photo caption page at Historic American Buildings Survey

Houses on the National Register of Historic Places in Pennsylvania
Houses completed in 1720
Houses in Chester County, Pennsylvania
National Register of Historic Places in Chester County, Pennsylvania
1720 establishments in Pennsylvania